Magdalena Koleśnik  (born 27 February 1990) is a Polish stage, film and television actress.

Life and career 
Born in Białystok, Koleśnik studied at the Faculty of Puppetry Arts of the Theatre Academy in her hometown and then at the AST National Academy of Theatre Arts in Kraków, from which she graduated in 2015. She made her stage debut while she was still a student, in 2012, at the Ateneum Theatre in Warsaw. In 2014 she made her film debut, appearing in three films.

Koleśnik had her breakout in 2020, playing the leading role in Magnus von Horn's Sweat; for her performance she won various awards, including the award for best actress at the Gdynia Film Festival, and the 2011 Zbigniew Cybulski Award, and was nominated for best actress at the 2022 Polish Film Awards.

Selected filmography
 Warsaw 44 (2014)
 Stones for the Rampart (2014)
  (2016)
  (2018)
 Brzydula (2020)
 Sweat (2020)
 Cracow Monsters (2022)

References

External links
 

1990 births
Living people  
People from Białystok  
Polish film actresses
Polish television actresses 
Polish stage actresses